Trischalis is a genus of moths in the family Erebidae erected by George Hampson in 1894.

Description
Palpi slight and porrect (extending forward). Antennae minutely ciliated in male. Forewings short, broad and rounded with arched costa. Veins 4,5 and 6,7 and 8,9 stalked. Hindwings with stalked veins 4,5 and 6,7. Vein 8 from middle of cell.

Species
 Trischalis absconditana (Walker, 1863)
 Trischalis aureoplagiata (Rothschild, 1913)
 Trischalis convoluta Hampson, 1918
 Trischalis iridescens Rothschild, 1913
 Trischalis purpurastriata De Vos & van Mastrigt, 2007
 Trischalis splendens De Vos & van Mastrigt, 2007
 Trischalis stomata Holloway, 2001
 Trischalis subaurana (Walker, 1863)
 Trischalis zahrae De Vos & van Mastrigt, 2007

References

 Entomofauna 28(18): 213–240.
 

Nudariina
Moth genera